Newnes Glacier is a glacier dropping sharply from the Adare Saddle to empty into Protection Cove at the head of Robertson Bay, Victoria Land. Charted by British Antarctic Expedition, 1898–1900, under C.E. Borchgrevink, who named it for Sir George Newnes, sponsor of the expedition.

Glaciers of Pennell Coast